The 2017–18 season was Sevilla FC's 111th season in existence and the club's 17th consecutive season in La Liga, the top league of Spanish football. Sevilla competed in La Liga, the Copa del Rey and the UEFA Champions League.

Kit
Supplier: New Balance

Players

Current squad
.

Transfers

In

Total spending:  €64,000,000

Out

Total income:  €61,100,000

Net:  €2,900,000

Pre-season and friendlies

Summer

Competitions

Overall

Overview

Cards
Accounts for all competitions. Last updated on 22 December 2017.

Clean sheets
Last updated on 22 December 2017.

References

External links

Sevilla FC seasons
Sevilla FC
Sevilla FC